Blame It on the Night is a 1984 American drama film directed by Gene Taft and written by Len Jenkin. The film stars Nick Mancuso, Byron Thames, Leslie Ackerman and Richard Bakalyan. The film was released on November 2, 1984, by Tri-Star Pictures.

Plot
Job Dalton is the illegitimate son of star rocker Chris Dalton.  He is attending a military school when he receives the sad news that his mother has died.  Chris is on tour when the news of the death of Job's mother reaches him.  A bit bored with his life and desiring to gain a relationship with his son, he decides to bring the boy on tour with him.   To Job, who has only heard his mother's version of their relationship, and who views the military school as home, and aspires to a military career, his father's life and career are as foreign as life on Mars.

What follows are lessons for both as Chris learns how to set limits, how to talk (and listen to) a teenager; and Job learns how to loosen up and enjoy life.  They clash frequently on their way to understanding each other, but the denouement in the desert is moving and leaves the viewer feeling they're on the right track.

Cast 

Nick Mancuso as Chris Dalton
Byron Thames as Job Dalton
Leslie Ackerman as Shelly
Richard Bakalyan as Manzini
Leeyan Granger as Melanie 
Rex Ludwick as Animal
Michael Wilding Jr. as Terry
Dennis Tufano as Leland
Stephen John Hunter as S.G.
Gary Chase as Buster
Merry Clayton as herself
Billy Preston as himself
Ollie E. Brown as himself
Mark J. Goodman as himself 
Melissa Prophet as Charlotte
Joe Mantell as Attorney
Sandy Kenyon as Colonel
Linda Blais as Stewardess
James Bem Sobieski as Cadet in Barracks
Ida Martin as Baby Nicholas
Lily Martin as Baby Nicholas
Anthony T. Mazzucchi as Mazzucchi
Shepard Saunders as Bob Ritz
Robert Michaels as Peter Styne
Judith Marx as Yvonne
Marissa Ravelli as Daughter #1
Wendy Brainard as Daughter #2
Nina Franciosa as Girl in Audience
Andrew Lauer as Boy in Audience
Richard Caruso as Sax Player
Marla Phillips as Gloria Aaron
Candy Chase as Cowgirl
Lee Schaff Guardino as Cowgirl
Larry Randles as Cowboy
Greg Gault as Cowboy
Paul Micale as Policeman
Heidi Banks as Groupie #1
Paige Nan Pollack as Groupie #2
Rhonda Rosen as Waitress
Hank Robinson as Umpire
Ralph E. MacEwen as Roadie
Max Rasmussen as Roadie
Jim Veneziano as Roadie
Bradley Lieberman as Cadet
Erik Troy as Cadet

References

External links 
 

1984 drama films
1984 films
American drama films
1980s English-language films
TriStar Pictures films
Films scored by Tom Scott
1984 directorial debut films
1980s American films